Clonitazene is an opioid analgesic of approximately three times the potency of morphine. It is related to etonitazene, an opioid of significantly higher potency. Clonitazene is not currently marketed.  It is a controlled substance; in the United States it is a Schedule I Narcotic controlled substance with a DEA ACSCN of 9612 and an established manufacturing quota of 25 grams for 2022.

References 

Benzimidazole opioids
Chloroarenes
Mu-opioid receptor agonists
Diethylamino compounds